Gabriel Cardoni (born 13 Sep 1986), known professionally as Koito, is an Italian rapper

Biography
Koito, pseudonym of Gabriel Cardoni (Rome, 13 September 1986), is a songwriter and Italian Rapper. was born and raised in Rome.
He began his artistic career in the early 2000s, approached the world of Rap at the age of 16 and at 18 he began composing the first musical bases and writing the first rap texts

Discography

Album Solo 
 2010 - Help (Ep) (Chimica Recordz Label) 
 2012 - Favole Moderne(Chimica Recordz Label) 
 2014 - Tra Sogno e Realtà(Chimica Recordz Label)

Whit SenzaRazza 
 2009 - SenzaRazza Mixtape Vol.1 
 2011 - SenzaRazza Mixtape Vol.2  
 2012 - Remember the name (Ep) (Chimica Recordz Label)

Whit Buio 
 2016 - Monet(Deep Sound RecordZ Label)

Collaborations 
 2009 - SenzaRazza feat. Er Gitano - La Minaccia (da SenzaRazza Mixtape Vol.1)
 2009 - SenzaRazza feat. Diluvio - Facce Vede (da SenzaRazza Mixtape Vol.1)
 2009 - Koito feat. Gose - Non mi puoi capire (da Raccolta differenziata)
 2009 - Koito feat. Er Gitano - Notte dopo Notte (da Raccolta differenziata)
 2010 - Koito feat. Er Gitano, Joker - Attento (da Raccolta differenziata)
 2011 - SenzaRazza feat. Er Gitano, Saga, Daryl Smoke - Paid in Full (da Raccolta differenziata)
 2011 - SenzaRazza feat. Jesto -Chiamate la Neuro (da SenzaRazza Mixtape Vol.2)
 2011 - SenzaRazza feat. Er Gitano - Chiusi nelle Celle (da SenzaRazza Mixtape Vol.2)
 2011 - SenzaRazza feat. Saga - Working Progress (da SenzaRazza Mixtape Vol.2)
 2012 - Koito feat. Saga - Non ne posso più (da Favole Moderne)
 2016 - Koito feat. Buio - Tutto ok (da Monet)

External links

References 

Italian rappers
1986 births
Living people